Ryan Phelim Manning (born 14 June 1996) is an Irish footballer who plays as a midfielder and left-wing back for Swansea City and the Republic of Ireland national team.

Career

Mervue United
Ryan Manning started his career playing for Mervue United in the League of Ireland First Division, the second tier of Irish football. He spent one season there in which Mervue reached the League of Ireland promotion/relegation playoffs but lost out to Longford Town on penalties in the semi-final after a scoreline of 3–3 on aggregate.

Galway United
After a single season at Mervue he moved to fellow First Division side Galway United for the 2014 season. Manning and Galway had a brilliant season as they went on to win promotion to the Premier Division via the Promotion/relegation playoffs, with Manning scoring in both legs of the final as United brushed aside Premier Division outfit UCD in a 5–1 aggregate win.

Queens Park Rangers
In January 2015 Manning was signed by Queens Park Rangers on a two and a half year contract. The then manager Harry Redknapp stated he was delighted that Ryan had signed for QPR after having received interest from other Premier League clubs.

After Redknapp departed QPR, Manning initially did not feature under the first team under managers Chris Ramsey or Jimmy Floyd Hasselbaink. But, with the arrival of Ian Holloway, he was given his first team debut on 31 December 2016 against Wolves a game that Rangers went on to win after having had a run of six consecutive losses. He performed so well that he was hailed by his manager as having been "outstanding". Manning described his own debut as a dream come true, especially as he only received his squad number the day before. He impressed in his next two games, which were all victories, and he was thus awarded a new contract tying him to the club until 2019. He rounded off the month by scoring his first league goal against Fulham on 21 January, in a game which ended in a 1–1 draw against their west London rivals.

Rotherham United (loan)
On 16 August 2018, Manning joined Rotherham United on a loan deal until the end of the 2018–19 season. Manning was recalled by QPR in January 2019. He made 18 appearances and scored four goals for Rotherham during his time on loan at the New York Stadium.

Swansea City
On 16 October 2020, Manning joined fellow Championship side Swansea City for an undisclosed fee, signing a three-year contract.  He made his debut for the club on 27 October, starting in a 2–0 victory over Stoke City, a victory that saw Swansea move into the automatic promotion places.

In September 2021 Manning was sent flying by Luton Town midfielder Henri Lansbury after kicking the ball away and preventing a free kick from being taken. Lansbury was shown a yellow card by the ref and elevated to legend status by the Kenilworth Road faithful.

In February 2023, Swansea manager Russell Martin confirmed that Manning would depart the club at the end of the season with the defender having no intentions of signing a new contract.

International career
On 6 November 2018, Manning was named in the senior Republic of Ireland squad for the first time for the friendly against Northern Ireland on 15 November and the UEFA Nations League match against Denmark on 19 November 2018. He made his senior international debut against Bulgaria in the UEFA Nations League 18 November 2020.

Career statistics

Club

International

References

Living people
1996 births
People from Galway (city)
Association footballers from County Galway
Republic of Ireland association footballers
Republic of Ireland youth international footballers
Republic of Ireland under-21 international footballers
Republic of Ireland international footballers
Mervue United A.F.C. players
Galway United F.C. players
Queens Park Rangers F.C. players
Rotherham United F.C. players
Swansea City A.F.C. players
League of Ireland players
English Football League players
Association football midfielders
Republic of Ireland expatriate association footballers
Expatriate footballers in England
Irish expatriate sportspeople in England